Dean White may refer to:

 Dean White (basketball) (1923–1992), American basketball player
 Dean White (businessman) (1923–2016), American billionaire
 Dean White (director), American television director and producer
 Dean White (footballer) (born 1958), English former footballer
 Dean White (comics), comic book colorist on Spider-Man: One More Day etc.